Pešić or Pesic (Cyrillic script: Пешић) is a Serbian surname.

Geographical distribution
As of 2014, 86.5% of all known bearers of the surname Pešić were residents of Serbia (frequency 1:377), 5.4% of the Republic of Macedonia (1:1,783), 3.1% of Montenegro (1:910), 2.6% of Croatia (1:7,498), 1.3% of Bosnia and Herzegovina (1:12,277) and 1.1% of Kosovo (1:7,758).

In Serbia, the frequency of the surname was higher than national average (1:377) in the following districts:
Jablanica District (1:60)
Pirot District (1:114)
Pčinja District (1:119)
Nišava District (1:155)
Toplica District (1:206)
Zaječar District (1:225)
Podunavlje District (1:299)

People
Aleksandar Pešić (born 1992), Serbian footballer
Ante Pešić (born 1974), Croatian football player
Branko Pešić (1922–1986), Yugoslav  communist politician
Dejan Pešić (born 1976), Serbian goalkeeper who currently plays for Shahin Bushehr F.C. in the Iranian Azadegan League
Dragiša Pešić (born 1954), politician from Montenegro who was the last Prime Minister of Federal Republic of Yugoslavia
Dušan Pešić (born 1955), Serbian former international footballer who played for midfield position
Ivan Pešić (footballer, born 1989), Serbian footballer for FK Mladost Lučani
Ivan Pešić (footballer, born 1992), Croatian footballer for RNK Split
Ivan Pešić (handballer) (born 1989), Croatian handball goalkeeper
Ivan Pesic (businessman), founder of Silvaco
Jure Pešić, Croatian opera singer (baritone)
Iliya Pesic, chairman of Silvaco, son of Ivan Pesic
Marko Pešić, German basketballer
Miroljub Pešić (born 1993), Serbian football defender
Nikola Pešić (born 1973), artist born in Belgrade
Svetislav Pešić (born 1949), former Serbian professional basketball player and a present-day Serbian basketball coach
Vesna Pešić (born 1940), Serbian politician, one of the leaders of opposition movement in Serbia
Vladimir Pešić, Montenegrin biologist, expert in Gastropoda and entomology
Zoran Pešić (born 1983), Serbian football player
Zoran Pešić (born 1983), Serbian rugby league player
Zoran Pešić (born 1951), Serbian football player

References 

Serbian surnames